Nawa is a city in Syria, administratively belonging to the Daraa Governorate. It had a population of 59,170 in 2007, making it the 28th largest city per geographical entity in Syria.

During classical antiquity, it was known as Neve or Naveh, and was part of the Roman province of Arabia Petraea.

History

Roman and Byzantine periods 
During the Roman and Byzantine periods, Nawa had a large Jewish population. The city is mentioned in ancient Jewish sources, such as the 3rd century Mosaic of Rehob and the Midrash Rabba; it is also referred to by George of Cyprus ("Descriptio orbis romani", ed. Heinrich Gelzer, 54) in the 7th century. 

Numerous basalt architectural elements from the Byzantine period, bearing Jewish symbols—most prominently the menorah—were discovered ire used as spolia within Nawa (A. Reifenberg, 'Ancient Hebrew Arts', 1952).

Early Islamic period 
Under the Islamic Caliphate of the Rashidun, Umayyads, and Abbasids, it was a part of Jund Dimashq and the principal city of Hauran.

Ayyubid period 
By the 13th century, its status declined; Yaqut al-Hamawi recorded in 1225 that Nawa was "a small town of the Hauran," formerly the capital of the region. He describe it as the city where Job dwelled in and the burial place of Shem, the son of Noah. In 1233, Imam Yahya ibn Sharaf al-Nawawi, a prominent Muslim scholar, was born in the city.

Ottoman period 
In 1596 Nawa appeared in the Ottoman tax registers as Nawi and was part of the nahiya of Jaydur in the Hauran Sanjak. It had an entirely Muslim population consisting of 102 households and 43 bachelors.  The villagers paid a fixed tax-rate of 40% on wheat, barley, summer crops, goats and/or beehives; a total of 26,000 akçe.

Syrian civil war 
In July 2018, the citizens of Nawa were subject to heavy Syrian government and Russian military bombardment, in an effort to rid the city from its anti-government forces.

Ecclesiastical history
The bishopric of Neve (Nawa) was a suffragan of Bostra, the metropolitan see of Arabia Petraea. Two of its bishops are known: 
Petronius, who attended the Council of Ephesus in 431;
Jobius, who was present at the Council of Chalcedon in 451.

Isaac, mentioned by Le Quien as a third bishop, of about 540 (Oriens christiana, II, 864), was a bishop not of Neve but of Nineve, and lived at the end of the seventh century ("Échos d'Orient", IV, 11).

The Diocese of Neve is noticed in the Notitia episcopatuum of the patriarchate of Antioch in the 6th century ("Échos d'Orient", X, 145).

References

Bibliography

External links
Map of town, Google Maps
Naoua-map, 20L

Cities in Syria
Populated places in Izra' District
Catholic titular sees in Asia
Ancient Jewish settlements of the Golan Heights